Clube Atlético Mineiro, commonly known as Atlético Mineiro or Vingadoras, is a Brazilian women's Association football club, based in the city of Belo Horizonte, Minas Gerais. They won the  seven times.

History

Atlético's women's team was dissolved in 2012, due to lack of funding. On 19 December 2018, the club announced the return of the women's section, after CONMEBOL obliged all men's teams to have a senior women's team playing in a competition.

Players

Current squad

Honours
 :
 Winners (8): 2006, 2009, 2010, 2011, 2012, 2020, 2021, 2022

References

External links
 

Clube Atlético Mineiro
Women's football clubs in Brazil
Association football clubs established in 2005
2005 establishments in Brazil